The South African type EW1 tender was a steam locomotive tender.

Type EW1 tenders entered service between 1953 and 1955 as tenders to the Class 25NC  Northern type steam locomotives which entered service on the South African Railways in those years.

Manufacturers
Type EW1 tenders were built in 1953, eleven by North British Locomotive Company and 39 by Henschel and Son.

The South African Railways (SAR) placed fifty Class 25NC locomotives in service between 1953 and 1955. The locomotive and tender were designed by L.C. Grubb, Chief Mechanical Engineer of the SAR from 1949 to 1954. It was the non-condensing version of the Class 25 condensing locomotive, of which ninety were placed in service at the same time.

Characteristics
The tender rode on six-wheeled bogies, each with a  wheelbase and fitted with Timken roller bearings. It was equipped with a mechanical stoker, of which the engine was mounted on the tender. The tender had a one-piece steel casting water-bottom frame, with the frame itself forming the bottom of the tank instead of being a separate tank and frame as in previous designs. The casting was done by Commonwealth Steel Castings Corporation in the United States of America.

Locomotive
Only Class 25NC locomotives were delivered new with Type EW1 tenders, which were numbered in the range from 3401 to 3450 for their engines. An oval number plate, bearing the engine number and often also the locomotive class and tender type, was attached to the rear end of the tender.

Classification letters
Since many tender types are interchangeable between different locomotive classes and types, a tender classification system was adopted by the SAR. The first letter of the tender type indicates the classes of engines to which it could be coupled. The "E_" tenders were arranged with mechanical stokers and could be used with the locomotive classes as shown.
 Class 15F, if equipped with a mechanical stoker.
 Class 23.
 Class 25NC.
 Class 26.

The second letter indicates the tender's water capacity.

Modification
Between 1979 and 1981, the last one of the Class 25NC locomotives, no. 3450, was rebuilt to the sole Class 26 Red Devil. Since the water capacity remained unchanged, the tender was not reclassified.

A number, when added after the letter code, indicates differences between similar tender types, such as function, wheelbase or coal bunker capacity.

Illustration

References

EW1